Maksim Hienadzievich Andraloits (born 17 June 1997) is a Belarusian decathlete. He won a silver medal at the 2016 World U20 Championships and a bronze at the 2015 European Junior Championships.

Competition record

Personal bests

Outdoor
100 metres – 10.92 (-0.9 m/s, Florence 2018)
400 metres – 48.56 (Berlin 2018)
1500 metres – 4:43.65 (Bydgoszcz 2016)
110 metres hurdles – 14.47 (+1.5 m/s, Bydgoszcz 2017)
High jump – 2.04 (Bydgoszcz 2016)
Pole vault – 5.00 (Minsk 2018)
Long jump – 7.37 (+1.4 m/s, Brest 2018)
Shot put – 15.33 (Berlin 2018)
Discus throw – 44.41 (Florence 2017)
Javelin throw – 52.40 (Tallinn 2017)
Decathlon – 7863 (Florence 2018)

Indoor
60 metres – 7.09 (Gomel 2018)
1000 metres – 2:52.13 (Minsk 2016)
60 metres hurdles – 8.10 (Mogilyov 2015)
High jump – 2.07 (Gomel 2018)
Pole vault – 4.40 (Minsk 2016)
Long jump – 7.24 (Mogilyov 2016)
Shot put – 14.37 (Gomel 2018)

References

1997 births
Living people
Belarusian decathletes

be:Максім Генадзевіч Андралойць